The Saint-Louis River is a tributary of the Valin River, flowing on the northwest shore of the Saint Lawrence River, in the unorganized territory of Mont-Valin and the municipality of Saint-David-de-Falardeau, in the Le Fjord-du-Saguenay Regional County Municipality, in the administrative region of Saguenay-Lac-Saint-Jean, in the Province of Quebec, in Canada.

The forest road R0201 serves most of the hydrographic slope of the Saint-Louis river, for the needs of forestry and recreational tourism activities. The mouth of this river flows to the northwest limit of the Monts-Valin National Park.

Forestry is the main economic activity in the sector; recreational tourism, second.

The surface of the Saint-Louis River is usually frozen from the end of November to the beginning of April, however the safe circulation on the ice is generally made from mid-December to the end of March.

Geography 
The main watersheds neighboring the Saint-Louis river are:
 North side: Nisipi River, Shipshaw River, Tête Blanche River, Onatchiway Lake, Little Onatchiway Lake;
 East side: Martin-Valin Lake, Sainte-Marguerite River, North Arm, Moncouche lake;
 South side: Valin River, Shipshaw River, rivière des Outardes, North arm, Canoe arms, arm of Hell, Fournier Arm;
 West side: canoe arms, Lake La Mothe, Étienne River, Tchitogama Lake, White River, Shipshaw River, Péribonka River.

The Saint-Louis river takes its source from an unidentified lake. A mountain peak in the southwest reaches  of elevation. This source is located in the unorganized territory of Mont-Valin at:
  West of Moncouche Lake;
  South-West of lake Poulin-De Courval;
 ) east of a bay of La Mothe lake which is crossed to the south by the Shipshaw River;
  North of the mouth of the Valin river (confluence with the Saguenay River).

Upper course of the Saint-Louis river (segment of )

  towards the North, then towards the West by crossing Lac Croteau on its full length to its mouth;
  westwards, up to a bend in the river;
  towards the South-West by meandering, up to the Céline stream (coming from the North);
  towards the South-West, then the South by collecting Le Gros Ruisseau at the end of the segment and meandering up to the women's stream (coming from the East);

Lower course of the Saint-Louis river (segment of )

  towards the South-East by collecting the stream at Vimy (coming from the West) and the stream Alcide (coming from the West), up to the stream at La Raquette (coming from the Northeast);
  towards the south by crossing Savard Falls at the end of the segment, up to Savard stream (coming from the West);
  towards the South-East by entering the municipality of Saint-David-de-Falardeau and by forming a loop towards the North-East at the end of the segment, until the mouth of the river.

The Saint-Louis river flows at the bottom of a small bay on the west bank of the Valin River. This mouth is located at:
  Southeast of La Mothe lake which is crossed by the Shipshaw river;
  north of downtown Saguenay;
  North of the mouth of the Valin river;
  West of the mouth of the Saguenay river (confluence with the St. Lawrence river).

Toponymy 
The term "Saint-Louis" is a family name of French origin.

The toponym of “Saint-Louis river” was formalized on December 5, 1968, at the Place Names Bank of the Commission de toponymie du Québec.

See also
 Saint-David-de-Falardeau, a municipality
 Mont-Valin, a TNO
 Le Fjord-du-Saguenay Regional County Municipality
 Saguenay River, a stream
 List of rivers of Quebec

Notes and references

External links 
 Official site of the MRC Le Fjord-du-Saguenay

Rivers of Saguenay–Lac-Saint-Jean
Le Fjord-du-Saguenay Regional County Municipality